Ayanna Hutchinson (born 18 February 1978) is a track and field sprint athlete who competes internationally for Trinidad and Tobago.

Career

Hutchinson represented Trinidad and Tobago at the 2008 Summer Olympics in Beijing. She competed at the 4x100 metres relay together with Kelly-Ann Baptiste, Wanda Hutson and Semoy Hackett. In their first round heat they did not finish and were eliminated due to a mistake with the baton exchange.

Ayanna Hutchinson represented Trinidad and Tobago at the 2000 Sydney Olympics where she competed in the 100m, and the 2004 Athens Olympics as a part of the 4 × 100 m relay team but due to a missed exchange they were eliminated .  She was a semi-finalist at the 2006 Commonwealth Games in Melbourne and at the 2009 World Championships in Berlin. Together with Kelly-Ann Baptiste, Semoy Hackett and Reyare Thomas set a national record in the 4 × 100 m at the 2009 Berlin World Championships.

Achievements

Personal Best – Outdoor
100 Metres	11.26; 200 Metres	23.35
Personal Best – Indoor
60 Metres	7.28

Honours
100 Metres
12th IAAF World Championships in Athletics		8	sf	11.58	-0.10	Berlin; 
18th Commonwealth Games		5	sf	11.53	-0.30	Melbourne

References

External links
 
 Picture of Ayanna Hutchinson

1978 births
Living people
Trinidad and Tobago female sprinters
Olympic athletes of Trinidad and Tobago
Athletes (track and field) at the 2000 Summer Olympics
Athletes (track and field) at the 2004 Summer Olympics
Athletes (track and field) at the 2008 Summer Olympics
Athletes (track and field) at the 2006 Commonwealth Games
Athletes (track and field) at the 2010 Commonwealth Games
Central American and Caribbean Games silver medalists for Trinidad and Tobago
Competitors at the 2006 Central American and Caribbean Games
Competitors at the 2010 Central American and Caribbean Games
Central American and Caribbean Games medalists in athletics
Commonwealth Games competitors for Trinidad and Tobago
Athletes (track and field) at the 2007 Pan American Games
Pan American Games competitors for Trinidad and Tobago
Olympic female sprinters